St David's Hall (Welsh: Neuadd Dewi Sant) is a performing arts and conference venue in the heart of Cardiff, Wales.

St David's Hall is the National Concert Hall and Conference Centre of Wales. It hosts the annual Welsh Proms and the biennial BBC Cardiff Singer of the World competition. As well as classical music it also plays host to jazz, soul, pop, rock, dance, children's, rhythm and blues, musicals and other forms of world music, as well as light entertainment artists. The foyers in the centre are open and have regular free performances from music groups. The foyers, balconies and bar areas are also used to host art exhibitions.

History

Planning and Construction 
Credit is given to the Conservative leader of Cardiff City Council, Ron Watkiss, for bringing St David's Hall to fruition. A bronze bust of him is on display in the foyer of the building.

Architects Seymour Harris Partnership had the task of fitting a major 2000 seat, acoustically perfect auditorium, with surrounding dressing rooms, bars, foyers, a restaurant, offices and spacious concourse into a cramped city centre space.  The space available was so cramped that they had to fit the complex into and on top of an already planned and partly built St. David's Shopping Centre. As a result, they had to use every inch of space available and the building has an unusual shape. The main contractor was John Laing & Son. It held its first concert on 11 September 1982.  It was officially opened over 5 months after the first concert on 15 February 1983 by the Queen Mother, followed by a concert by the Welsh Symphony Orchestra conducted by Owain Arwel Hughes. Hughes and Watkiss later brought the Welsh Proms to the venue.

The Wales Millennium Centre has added significantly to the arts and cultural scene already present in the city of Cardiff. The angular grey concrete that makes up nearly the whole visible exterior and some interior foyers looks unmistakably 1970s/1980s modernist new build; the architectural magazine Building Design described the hall's style as "complex late brutalism".

BBC NOW 
BBC National Orchestra and Chorus of Wales (BBC NOW) is the orchestra-in-residence at St David's Hall, performing regularly between September and June each year. Almost all of the orchestra's concerts at St David's Hall are recorded for live or deferred broadcast on BBC Radio 3, and there are dedicated recording facilities within the concert hall to facilitate broadcasts.

21st century

Major events held at the Hall include the BBC Cardiff Singer of the World competition held every two years and the Welsh Proms held annually. Prizes for the Welsh Artist of the Year are awarded at the venue every June, followed by an exhibition of the winners and shortlisted works.

St David's Hall is continually developing its variety of shows. It re-branded the L3 Lounge venue, which has a partly seated capacity of 350 and is mainly used for daytime concerts, the Roots Unearthed folk series and Blas* – A Taste of the Fresh Welsh Sound.

In November 2022 talks were taking place between Cardiff Council and Academy Music Group (AMG) with view to AMG taking over the running of the venue. There was also a maintenance backlog which the council hoped would be taken on by the new operator.

Organ 
The concert organ of St. David's Hall was completed by Peter Collins in 1982, at a cost of £168,000. This would be the largest organ he ever built. The wooden case was designed by Ralph Downes. Due to problems with the action, J. W. Walker & Sons replaced the action and console, a great embarrassment at the time considering the cost of the organ. The organ has 3 manuals, and German-style continental registrations.

The main auditorium of St. David's Hall is regularly host to organ events, including lunchtime concerts. Many organists travel to try out the organ, and others come to give recitals, notably Olivier Latry, Anne Marsden Thomas, Ghislaine Reece-Trapp, and Margaret Phillips. St. David's Hall has also hosted concerts for major organ events such as the 2019 RCO OrganFest.

References

Sources

External links

1982 establishments in Wales
Brutalist architecture in the United Kingdom
Castle, Cardiff
Landmarks in Cardiff
Music venues completed in 1982
Music venues in Cardiff
Theatres in Cardiff